Dan Goldie was the defending champion but did not compete that year.

Robert Van't Hof won in the final 7–5, 6–4 against Brad Drewett.

Seeds

  John Fitzgerald (semifinals)
  Kelly Evernden (semifinals)
  Scott Davis (first round)
  Olli Rahnasto (first round)
  Glenn Layendecker (first round)
  Brad Drewett (final)
  Paul Chamberlin (quarterfinals)
  Christian Saceanu (first round)

Draw

Finals

Top half

Bottom half

References

External links
 1989 Seoul Open draw

Singles